Mr. Lucky is a CBS adventure/drama television series that aired from 1959 to 1960. The title character, played by John Vivyan, was an honest professional gambler who used his plush floating casino, the ship Fortuna, as his base of operations. His good friend Andamo helped him run the casino.

Blake Edwards developed the program as a retooling of his Willie Dante character from Four Star Playhouse, in which the role of a former gambler who operates Dante's Inferno, a San Francisco, California, nightclub, was played by Four Star studio boss Dick Powell.

Edwards directed and co-wrote the first episode of Mr. Lucky, and the credits of the first eighteen episodes included the text, "Entire production supervised by Blake Edwards." Jack Arnold (director of Creature from the Black Lagoon, The Incredible Shrinking Man, and It Came from Outer Space) produced the show and directed fifteen of the thirty-four episodes.

Henry Mancini's smooth theme music for the show reached Number 21 in the US singles charts. He released two successful LP's based on the show, Mr. Lucky and Mr. Lucky Goes Latin.

Cast and format
Along with John Vivyan cast in the title role, Ross Martin portrayed Andamo. Pippa Scott had a recurring role as Maggie Shank-Rutherford, Lucky's girlfriend. Tom Brown also had a recurring role, as Lieutenant Rovacs of the city police.

Mr. Lucky is an honest professional gambler with extraordinary luck. He carries a pocket watch whose chimes play the first five notes of the Mr. Lucky theme music. He and Andamo operate a floating casino aboard a luxury yacht anchored outside an American port city.  (The yacht in reality was the Alamo, a 148-foot yacht owned by former Compton, California mayor Col. C.S. Smith, publisher of the now-defunct Herald American Newspaper chain.)  Their business brings them into contact with numerous criminals and people hiding from criminals. This continues even after Lucky changes their business to a floating restaurant (see "Format change" below).

The website "TV Obscurities" indicates that Mr. Lucky's actual name was never identified in the series. The episode "Aces Back to Back" reveals that Lucky is a veteran of the United States Navy, and in the episode "Odyssey of Hate", he demonstrates that he still knows how to manipulate an M-1 rifle.

The end credits state that Mr. Lucky was "Based on an Original Story: 'Bundles for Freedom' by Milton Holmes." This story was also the basis of the 1943 motion picture Mr. Lucky, starring Cary Grant whose name in the film was Joe Adams. The film and the television series had little in common beside the title and the suave nature of the lead characters.

The first episode of the series, "The Magnificent Bribe", begins with Lucky and Andamo running a successful casino in Andamo's homeland, the island nation of Chobolobo (the name is not mentioned until the second episode). To stay in business, they must pay a weekly bribe of $1000 to the country's corrupt president (Nehemiah Persoff). They lose everything because of Andamo's revolutionary activities: he uses Lucky's yacht, the Fortuna, to smuggle guns to the revolutionaries, and he helps a beautiful female assassin (Ziva Rodann) get into position to kill the president. The episode ends with Lucky and Andamo escaping in a small boat with nothing but the clothes on their backs.

In the second episode, "They Shall Not Pass", Lucky and Andamo arrive by freighter in an unnamed American port city. Lucky wins enough money in a crap game to buy another yacht and a truck full of gambling equipment. He renames the yacht Fortuna II (pronounced "Fortuna the Second"), and anchors her outside the three-mile limit to operate as a floating casino.

The city where Lucky and Andamo operate is never mentioned by name, and various episodes give conflicting clues as to its identity. The city's marked police cars (black and white 1959 Plymouth four-door sedans) are marked simply "POLICE", not with the city's name or seal.

Mr. Lucky drives a 1960 Chrysler New Yorker Chrysler Imperial convertible.

Format change
Beginning with the February 6, 1960, episode ("The Brain Picker"), Lucky changed his business from a floating casino to a floating restaurant. This was done by order of the show's sponsor, Lever Brothers, due mainly to the 1950s quiz show scandals. Dwight Whitney wrote about the format change in the following week's issue of TV Guide:

"The Fumigated Air: Lever Bros. came up with a puzzling decision last week. It decided that soap and gambling don't mix. As the sponsor of one of the year's two big hits, Mr. Lucky (the other being Dennis the Menace), the powers-that-be sent down orders that the celebrated television character played by John Vivyan would henceforth have to be made respectabilized. Almost immediately Lucky turned up running a restaurant instead of gambling aboard his ship. By so ordering it seemed that the soap company was taking a big gamble itself. By taking the bite out of the character, it was running a very real risk of transforming one of the season's big hits into a big flop, to say nothing of fumigating the air so thoroughly that even soap suds might seem astringent after that."

Cancellation
Despite the fact that the show was one of the highest-rated new series of the 1959–1960 season, being ranked 21st among programs with a 24.4 average household share, Lever Brothers (and alternate sponsor Brown & Williamson) cancelled their sponsorship at the end of the season. CBS could not find other sponsors to replace them, and finally cancelled the series. John Vivyan believed the program was pulled in order to give up its Saturday time slot, as a favor to Jack Benny, to a new drama in the fall of 1960, Checkmate, which was produced by Benny's company, JaMco Productions.

Attempted revivals
Blake Edwards developed a Mr. Lucky movie for Paramount Pictures in the mid-1960s to follow his big screen adaptation of Peter Gunn for the studio. The disappointing performance of the film Gunn saw the project's  abandonment. Aaron Spelling and Blake Edwards later teamed to develop a movie of the week in 1980, Casino, starring Mike Connors as a similar gambler character. Edwards developed another Mr. Lucky revival for New World Television in the late 1980s to follow his Peter Gunn revival for the studio. When the latter project failed to be picked up as a weekly series, New World pulled the plug on Mr. Lucky.

Episode list

Home media
On October 16, 2012, Timeless Media Group released Mr. Lucky - The Complete Series on DVD in Region 1.  The 4-disc set features all 34 episodes of the series, and a bonus CD featuring Henry Mancini's soundtrack. The show is also available for streaming to subscribers of Amazon Prime Video.

Soundtrack Recordings

Music From Mr. Lucky (RCA Victor LPM/LSP-2198) was released in 1960. It was recorded at RCA Victor's Music Center of the World, Hollywood, California, on December 4, 10, and 17, 1959. The album was produced by Dick Peirce. Al Schmitt was the recording engineer. Don Peters was responsible for the cover design.
 "Mr. Lucky"  – 2:17
 "My Friend Andamo"  – 3:34
 "Softly"  – 2:47
 "March of the Cue Balls"  – 3:18
 "Lightly Latin"  – 2:59
 "Tipsy"  – 2:33
 "Floating Pad"  – 2:57
 "One-Eyed Cat"  – 3:17
 "Night Flower"  – 2:28
 "Chime Time"  – 3:20
 "Blue Satin"  – 2:37
 "That's It And That's All"  – 2:54

Mr. Lucky Goes Latin (RCA Victor LPM/LSP-2360) was released in 1961. It was recorded at RCA Victor's Music Center of the World, Hollywood, California. The album was produced by Dick Peirce. Al Schmitt was the recording engineer. Don Peters was responsible for the cover design.
 "Mr. Lucky Goes Latin" – 2:13
 "Lujon" – 2:37
 "Tinpanola" – 2:04
 "Rain Drops In Rio" – 2:42
 "Siesta" – 2:50
 "The Dancing Cat" – 2:57
 "Cow Bells And Coffee Beans" – 3:03
 "The Sound Of Silver" – 2:31
 "Tango Americano" – 2:42
 "No-Cal Sugar Loaf" – 2:05
 "Blue Mantilla" – 2:30
 "Speedy Gonzales" – 1:42

References

External links
 

1959 American television series debuts
1960 American television series endings
1950s American drama television series
1960s American drama television series
American adventure drama television series
CBS original programming
Television shows set in California
Black-and-white American television shows
Live action television shows based on films
English-language television shows
Works set on ships
Nautical television series
Gambling in fiction